Akram Zaatari (born 1966 in Sidon, Lebanon) is a filmmaker, photographer, archival artist and curator. In 1997, he co-founded the Arab Image Foundation with photographers Fouad Elkoury, and Samer Mohdad. His work is largely based on collecting, studying and archiving the photographic history of the Arab World.

Zaatari was selected to represent Lebanon at the 2013 Venice Biennale by Sam Bardaouil and Till Fellrath, curators for the Lebanese Pavilion.

Work
Zaatari has been exploring issues pertinent to post-war Lebanon. He investigates the way television mediates territorial conflicts and wars, and is particularly interested in logic of religious and national resistance movements, and the circulation and production of images in the context of today's geographic division in the Middle East. His work has been widely exhibited worldwide in biennales and venues such as the Centre Pompidou and is in the permanent collection of museums such as Tate Modern and the Thyssen Bornemisza Contemporary.

Filmography
Majnounak (Crazy of You), 1997
Red Chewing Gum, 2000
Her + Him VAN LEO, 2001
How I love you, 2001
This Day (al yaoum), 2003
In this house, 2005
 Tomorrow Everything Will Be Alright, 2010
 On Photography People and Modern Times, 2010 
 Letter to a Refusing Pilot, 2013

Awards
 Grand Prize of the 17th International Contemporary Art Festival SESC_Videobrasil in São Paulo (2011)

Publications
The Vehicle. Picturing moments of transition in a modernizing society (Arab Image Foundation and Mind the Gap, 1999)
Mapping Sitting (Arab Image Foundation and Mind the Gap, 2002)
Hashem el Madani: Studio Practices (Arab Image Foundation, Mind the Gap and the Photographers' Gallery, 2004)
Hashem el Madani: Promenades (Arab Image Foundation and Mind the Gap, 2007)
Earth of Endless Secrets (Portikus and Beirut Art Center, 2010)
Against Photography (Kaph Books and MACBA, 2018)
 Building Index. Rifat Chadirji , edited by Akram Zaatari and Mark Wasiuta (Arab Image Foundation and Kaph Books, 2018)

Exhibitions

Solo exhibitions
Akram Zaatari. Objects of Study, Galerie Sfeir Semler, Hamburg, 2007
Earth of Endless Secrets. Writing for a Posterior Time, Beirut Art Center, 2009 
Akram Zaatari. Nature Morte, Baltic Mill, 2009
Akram Zaatari Composition for Two Wings, Oslo, Kunstnernes Hus, 2011
Liverpool Biennial Spotlight Akram Zaatari, Liverpool Biennial, 2012
This Day at Ten, Le Magasin-Cnac, Grenoble, 2012
Akram Zaatari, Letter to a refusing pilot, Lebanese Pavilion, Arsenale, 55. Venice Biennial, Venice, Italy, 2013
Akram Zaatari, All Is Well, Agnes Etherington Art Centre, Queens University, Kingston, ON, 2013-2014
Akram Zaatari, Unfolding, Moderna Museet, Stockholm, 2015
Akram Zaatari, Against Photography. An Annoted History of the Image Arab Foundation, MACBA, Barcelona, 2017 
Akram Zaatari. The Third Window, Sfeir Semler Gallery, Beirut 2018

Group exhibitions
Documenta (13), Kassel, 2012
 Across Boundaries. Focus on Lebanese Photography, curated by Tarek Nahas, Beirut Art Fair 2018

References

External links
 Akram Zaatari at Galerie Sfeir Semler, Hamburg and Beirut
 Akram Zaatari, Interview Revista Código
 Akram Zaatari at Universes in Universe

 Akram Zaatari profile at Kadist Art Foundation
 Akram Zaatari at in the collection of The Museum of Modern Art
 Projects 100: Akram Zaatari at The Museum of Modern Art

Lebanese photographers
Lebanese filmmakers
1966 births
Living people
Lebanese contemporary artists